The 1994 Commonwealth of Independent States Cup was the second edition of the competition between the champions of former republics of Soviet Union. It was won by Spartak Moscow who defeated Uzbek side Neftchi Fergana in the final. As at the previous edition of the tournament, Ukraine opted not to send a team.

Participants

1  Dynamo Kyiv (1992–93 Ukrainian champions) refused to participate (citing unwillingness to play at the traumatic artificial pitch) and were replaced by unofficial participants Russia U21 national team.

Group stage

Group A

Results

Group B
Unofficial table

Official table

Results

Group C

Results

Group D
Unofficial table

Official table

Results

Final rounds

Semi-finals

Final

Top scorers

External links
 1994 Commonwealth of Independent States Cup at RSSSF

1994
1994 in Russian football
1993–94 in European football
January 1994 sports events in Russia
1994 in Moscow